This is a list of airlines currently operating in New Caledonia.

See also
 List of airlines
 List of defunct airlines of Oceania

Airlines

New Caledonia
New Caledonia
New Caledonia

Airlines